Richard Cannings may refer to:

Richard Cannings (British Columbia politician), Canadian federal Member of Parliament from British Columbia,
Richard Cannings (Ontario politician), former city councillor in Ottawa